Diary of a Lagos Girl is a 2016 Nollywood film. The film tells a story of a Lagos girl searching for Mr. Right – a man with everything going for him.

Cast
Alexx Ekubo
Linda Ejiofor
Dolapo Oni
Liz Amaye

References

External links
 

2016 films
English-language Nigerian films
2010s English-language films